The 1954 Challenge Desgrange-Colombo was the seventh edition of the Challenge Desgrange-Colombo. It included eleven races: all the races form the 1953 edition were retained with no additions. Ferdinand Kübler won his third individual championship (although he did not win any of the races) while Belgium won the nations championship.

Races

Final standings

Riders

Nations

References

 
Challenge Desgrange-Colombo
Challenge Desgrange-Colombo